Zeynep Dizdar (born 14 July 1976) is a Turkish singer-songwriter and composer.

Life and career 
Zeynep Dizdar stepped into her professional music life in 1997 with her debut album, Yolun Açık Ola. Dizdar, who took the first place in the radio and music charts with the song "Vazgeç Gönül" in the album, received positive reviews from the music critics with this song and album. A music video was shot for the song "Nerede Olursan Ol". The song "Bir Hayvanın Günlüğünden", included in the same album, became one of the rare songs written for animals in the Turkish pop music history. Dizdar released her second studio album, İlle de Sen, in 2005. Produced by Ozan Çolakoğlu, İlle de Sen was released by Sarı Ev and Sony Music. Zeynep Dizdar wrote the lyrics for the songs "Yok Yok" and "Zehir Gibi", which became national hits.

Recordings for her third album, Sana Güvenmiyorum, began in July 2007, and the album was released a year later in July 2008. Five songs in this album were written and composed by Dizdar herself, and the songs "Sana Güvenmiyorum" and "Boşver" entered Turkey's official music chart. Dizdar's fourth album, Hayat Benim Elimde, was released in July 2010 by Erol Köse Production. For the first time in this album, Dizdar performed a cover of "Bir Çocuk Sevdim", written by Sezen Aksu and composed by Onno Tunç.

Diskography

Albums 
1997: Yolun Açık Ola
2005: İlle de Sen
2008: Sana Güvenmiyorum
2010: Hayat Benim Elimde
2011: Viraj
2015: Gönül Oyunu

EPs and singles 
2009: Aşkın Büyüsü
2012: 2012
2012: Maske
2013: İkimiz
2014: Party
2018: Bi Gülüşü
2018: Önsezi
2020: Kör Kurşun (feat. Murat Uyar)

Songds written/composed by Dizdar

Charts

References 

1976 births
Turkish lyricists
Living people
Turkish women singers